St. Charles School or Saint Charles School or variations may refer to:

in Canada
St. Charles Elementary School, formerly or also known as École St-Charles School, in Pierrefonds-Roxboro, Montreal, Quebec, a school in the Lester B. Pearson School Board's district

in the United States
St. Charles School (San Francisco), California, one of San Francisco's Designated Landmarks
Saint Charles Preparatory School, Columbus, Ohio

See also
St. Charles College Historic District, Catonsville, Maryland, listed on the National Register of Historic Places